The 1922 Connecticut gubernatorial election was held on November 7, 1922. Republican nominee Charles A. Templeton defeated Democratic nominee David Fitzgerald with 52.37% of the vote.

General election

Candidates
Major party candidates
Charles A. Templeton, Republican
David Fitzgerald, Democratic

Other candidates
Martin F. Plunkett, Socialist

Results

References

1922
Connecticut
Gubernatorial